Fits may refer to:
 FITS, a data format in astronomy
 FITS (board game), a 2009 board game
 Fits (album), a 2009 album by White Denim
 The Fits, an album by Aly Tadros
 The Fits, a British punk rock band
 The Fits (film), a 2015 American drama film
 Fury in the Slaughterhouse, a German rock band

See also
 Fit (disambiguation)